Shops at New West is a shopping centre in New Westminster, British Columbia, Canada. The complex is unique for its integration into New Westminster station, a SkyTrain station on Metro Vancouver's metropolitan rail system. The shopping centre opened on November 17, 2012 and is owned by First Capital Realty.

References

External links
 

Shopping malls in Metro Vancouver
Shopping malls established in 2012
Buildings and structures in New Westminster
2012 establishments in British Columbia